Shameel Chembakath (born 12 January 1986) is an Indian professional football manager and former professional player who played as a defender. He is currently the assistant manager of the Indian Super League club Hyderabad FC.

After retiring from football at an early age due to injury problems, he started his professional managerial career by managing the under-15 team of Kerala Blasters in 2017. Shameel also worked as the assistant coach of the reserves team of the Blasters that won the 2019–20 season of the Kerala Premier League

Playing career
Shameel started his youth career in Jharkhand by playing for the SAIL football academy in 1998. He signed with Viva Kerala in 2004 to his first professional contract. Shameel spent one year with Viva Kerala before signing for Vasco Sports Club Goa in 2005. Later in 2007, he was signed by the Kolkata based club Mohammedan S.C into their 2007–08 squad. During his time with Mohammedan S.C, he suffered an hamstring injury. In 2008 Bengal Mumbai FC signed Shameel into their 2008–09 season squad.

Shameel had been called for India national football team camp in 2007 for the Olympic qualifier competitions, but did not qualify to the final squad. He was forced to retire in 2009, aged just 23, after failing to recover from the long-term hamstring injury.

Managerial career
After retiring at the age of 23, Shameel worked as the head coach of different schools across Kerala. It was in 2014 that he entered into professional football coaching. He signed as the head coach of the Prodigy football academy, which ran in partnership with Kerala Blasters Football Schools. Later in 2016, Shameel signed for Muthoot football academy, which also ran in association with Kerala Blasters. He got the AFC B Coaching License in 2017. In the same year, Kerala Blasters decided to field their youth teams in Hero Elite League and Shameel was appointed as the head coach of the Under 15 team of the Blasters. His first accomplishment as a professional football coach came out during the 2018–19 Juniors League as the Under 15 side of the Blasters reached the semi-finals of the tournament. Later that year, he got the AFC A Coaching License. Shameel also worked with the reserve team of Kerala Blasters as their assistant manager and is known for the development of players like Sahal Abdul Samad and Mohammad Rakip. Also the Under-15 players Yoihenba Meitei and Aman Sahni, whom played under Shameel was called up for the India U-15 team in 2019. In 2020, the reserve side of the Blasters won the 2019–2020 season of the Kerala Premier League making it Shameel's first title claim as a manager. He also got some few chances to work as the assistant manager of the Kerala Blasters senior team towards the end of the 2018–2019 regular season. He left Kerala Blasters in 2020 after the end of his regular contract.

On 2 January 2021 it was announced that Shameel has signed a three year deal with Hyderabad FC as the head coach of their reserves team.

On 6 May 2022, he was promoted as the assistant coach of the senior team of Hyderabad for the 2022–23 season.

Career statistics

Managerial statistics
.

Honours

As a manager
Kerala Premier League: 2019–20: Winner
 5th CEM Gold Cup, Assam : Runner Up  

 Semi finalist of Durand Cup -2022

As a player
Subroto Cup: 1998, SAIL - Bokaro Ispat Vidyalaya, Bokaro Steel City: Winner

References

1986 births
Living people
Footballers from Kerala
Kerala Blasters FC non-playing staff
Kerala Blasters FC Reserves and Academy head coaches
Indian football managers
Indian footballers
Mohammedan SC (Kolkata) players
Vasco SC players
Bengal Mumbai FC players
Association football defenders